Stephen (II) from the kindred Csák (d. 1307/09) was a Hungarian noble who served as Wildgrave of Bakony in 1280.

Biography

He was born into the Trencsén branch of the gens Csák as the second son of Mark I. He had a brother Peter II and two sisters, including Maria, the wife of Ivánka Hont-Pázmány. His cousin was the oligarch Matthew III. Stephen had four children: Mark II; Peter III, who functioned as master of the horse between 1314 and 1317; Stephen III and a daughter, who married Roland III Rátót, son of palatine Roland II Rátót.

Stephen and his descendants remained landowners near the ancient estate of the genus, Csákvár, while his cousins, Matthew III and Csák acquired possessions in the north-western counties of the Kingdom of Hungary, where later Matthew III, as the most powerful oligarch, ruled de facto independently of the king and usurped royal prerogatives on his realm. Stephen also tried to establish a dominion independently of the central power, expanding his influence over the territories that surrounded his possessions and centre, the Csókakő Castle. His land acquisition methods were violent. Andrew III of Hungary called him a "powerful tyrant of the country" in 1295, when Stephen captured and imprisoned the members of the Süttői family from the kindred Szák in Esztergom County. In 1301, Henry, abbot of Bakonybél complained to the king that Stephen oppressed the whole of Veszprém County. Six years later the chapter of Esztergom protested against him because Stephen forcibly occupied Gyermely, Epöl and Dorog from the provost of the archdiocese for 20 years.

Stephen's economic interests were different from his cousins'. He acquired lands south of the Danube, while Matthew III and Csák built dominions north of the river. As a result, according to the genealogy, Stephen founded a Transdanubian side branch within the Trencsén branch. He owned Kobersdorf (Kabold), Sopron County as a royal gift, Bátorkő and Csesznek castles in Veszprém County, Gesztes Castle in Komárom County and Bajó in Esztergom County. This territorial separation excluded a possible clash between Stephen and his cousins. Initially, they progressed politically in the same way; they turned against king Andrew III and joined the opposition to the Árpád dynasty. On 10 February 1300, Charles II of Naples listed all three of them among his grandson Charles Robert's supporters. In June 1300, the Bossányi brothers, Barlaus and Irizlaus attacked the Csák dominion by order of the king. Their army also plundered Stephen's possessions.

After the extinction of the Árpád dynasty with the death of Andrew III in 1301, the two branches of the kindred Csák became politically isolated from each other. During the emerging war of succession, Stephen supported Charles Robert, while Matthew III was a partisan of Wenceslaus III of Bohemia. In September 1302, Stephen led Charles' army to occupy Buda Castle, Wenceslaus' residence; however the siege ended in failure, the pro-Přemyslid lord Ivan Kőszegi successfully defended the capital. In August 1304, Stephen was among the barons who signed the Treaty of Pressburg (Pozsony; today Bratislava, Slovakia) between Charles I and Rudolf III, Duke of Austria and Styria, against Wenceslaus. Stephen died between 1307 and 1309. His sons, Mark II and Peter III, attended the second coronation of Charles I on 15 June 1309, continuing their father's political orientation.

References

Sources
  Kristó, Gyula (1986). Csák Máté ("Matthew Csák"). Magyar História, Gondolat. Budapest. 
  Zsoldos, Attila (2011). Magyarország világi archontológiája, 1000–1301 ("Secular Archontology of Hungary, 1000–1301"). História, MTA Történettudományi Intézete. Budapest. 

1300s deaths
Stephen II
13th-century Hungarian people
14th-century Hungarian people
Year of birth unknown